Hillbilly Elegy is a 2020 American drama film directed by Ron Howard from a screenplay by Vanessa Taylor, It is based on the 2016 memoir of the same name, by J. D. Vance. The film stars Amy Adams, Glenn Close, Gabriel Basso, Haley Bennett, Freida Pinto, Bo Hopkins, and Owen Asztalos.

The title, Hillbilly Elegy, suggests a serious and somewhat reverent treatment of an otherwise looked-down-upon population. After buying the rights to Vance's book in 2017, Imagine Entertainment announced Howard as the film's director. Netflix acquired the distribution rights in January 2019, and much of the cast joined that April. Filming took place from June through August in Georgia and Ohio.

Hillbilly Elegy was released in select cinemas on November 11, 2020, before its streaming release on November 24, 2020, by Netflix. The film was recognized for its performances, with Close receiving Supporting Actress nominations at the Academy Awards, the Golden Globe Awards, and Screen Actors Guild Awards. Adams's performance was also recognized by the Screen Actors Guild, with a nomination for Outstanding Lead Actress. However, the film was also criticized, particularly for its screenplay and direction, receiving three nominations at the Golden Raspberry Awards: Worst Director for Howard, Worst Screenplay for Taylor, and Worst Supporting Actress for Close.

Plot
J. D. Vance looks back on his childhood in Middletown, Ohio, raised by his mother Beverly and her parents from Jackson, Kentucky. In 1997, young J. D. and his older sister Lindsay struggle with their mother's drug addiction and unstable behavior.

After an argument while driving, Bev threatens to crash the car before attacking J. D., causing him to flee to a nearby house. Bev is nearly arrested after breaking through the door to drag J. D. away; he lies to protect her. Soon afterwards, Bev's father Papaw dies. She is later fired for her erratic behavior as well as stealing pills during work hours, causing her to have a violent breakdown in front of the entire neighborhood. After a string of boyfriends, Bev marries her new boss but is unable to detox.

J. D. often spends time with his grandmother, Bonnie "Mamaw" Vance, who struggles to keep her daughter in line. She reluctantly convinces J. D. to give his mother clean urine for a drug test to keep her job. Mamaw is later hospitalized with pneumonia while J. D.’s grades start to slip as he begins acting out with his new stepbrother and their friends. J. D. joins them in drinking, drugs, and vandalism, before they crash Mamaw's car. Lindsay informs Mamaw, who discharges herself from the hospital and takes in J. D. to live with her.

Stern but well-meaning, Mamaw attempts to  curb J. D.'s outbursts after he is caught shoplifting a graphing calculator for school, warning J. D. that someone will need to care for the family when she is gone, and that he has the choice to make something of himself. Realizing how much Mamaw is struggling to support them both, J. D. finds a job and begins to excel in school, later joining the United States Marine Corps. He returns home when Mamaw dies, before he serves in Iraq. After his tour, J. D. uses the G.I. Bill to attend college.

In 2011, an adult J. D. works three jobs to put himself through Yale Law School. He hopes to secure a summer internship in Washington D.C. with his girlfriend Usha, but Lindsay calls him with the news that Bev has overdosed on heroin. Driving home to Middletown, J. D. struggles to find a rehab facility for his mother, and is offered a last chance for a job interview the following morning. Overwhelmed, J. D. refuses Usha's offer to come help.

Bev refuses to return to rehab, causing her most recent boyfriend to throw Bev out of his apartment. With Lindsay raising her own family, J. D. takes Bev to a motel, but discovers her using heroin in the bathroom. Wrestling the needle away from Bev, J. D. urges her not to give up, and leaves his mother with Lindsay as he departs for New Haven. He calls Usha, who keeps him company on the phone as he drives through the night. Surprising her in the morning, J. D. arrives in time for his interview.

An epilogue reveals that J. D. graduated from Yale and published his memoir. He and Usha married and had children, moving to Ohio to be near his family, including Lindsay and Bev, who has been sober for 6 years.

Cast
 Amy Adams as Beverly "Bev" Vance, J. D.'s mother
 Tierney Smith as young Beverly "Bev" Vance
 Glenn Close as Bonnie "Mamaw" Vance, J. D.'s grandmother
 Sunny Mabrey as young Bonnie "Mamaw" Vance
 Gabriel Basso as J. D. Vance
 Owen Asztalos as young J. D. Vance
 Haley Bennett as Lindsay Vance, J. D.'s sister
 Freida Pinto as Usha, J. D.'s girlfriend
 Bo Hopkins as Papaw Vance, J. D.'s grandfather

Production
Imagine Entertainment won the rights to the memoir in an April 2017 auction, for Ron Howard to direct. In February 2018, Vanessa Taylor was set to adapt the memoir into a screenplay. In March 2018, Ron Howard was spotted at the Buckingham Coal Mine near Corning, Ohio, scouting possible locations in Perry County. In October 2018 and March 2019, Howard was spotted in Middletown, Ohio, again scouting filming locations.

In January 2019, Netflix won the rights to the film after bidding $45 million on the project. Glenn Close, Amy Adams, Gabriel Basso and Haley Bennett joined the cast in April. In June 2019, Freida Pinto, Bo Hopkins and Owen Asztalos were added.

Principal photography began on June 12, 2019, in Atlanta, Georgia, and wrapped on August 8, 2019, in Middletown, Ohio, after a 43-day shooting schedule. Several days of filming took place in the book's setting of Middletown, Ohio, though much of the filming was done in Atlanta, Clayton, and Macon, Georgia, using the production code-name "IVAN." Hans Zimmer and David Fleming composed the film's music.

By January 2020, the film was in post-production.

Release
Hillbilly Elegy began a limited theatrical release in the United States on November 11, 2020, then streamed on Netflix starting November 24.

It was the most-watched film on the site in its first day of release, before finishing third in its debut weekend. Over its second weekend the film fell to eighth place.

Reception

Critical response

Critical response to Hillbilly Elegy was "fairly negative", but the performances of its cast received some praise. The website's critics consensus reads, "With the form of an awards-season hopeful but the soul of a bland melodrama, Hillbilly Elegy strands some very fine actors in the not-so-deep South." According to Metacritic, which calculated a weighted average score of 38 out of 100 based on 43 critics, the film received "generally unfavorable reviews".

The Independent reported that the film was widely criticized for "perpetuating stereotypes about the poor". Katie Rife of The A.V. Club called it "bootstrapping poverty porn" and said that it "reinforces the stereotypes it's meant to be illuminating."

Owen Gleiberman of Variety wrote "As long as Close is acting up an award-worthy storm (her performance is actually quite meticulous), Hillbilly Elegy is never less than alive. Amy Adams does some showpiece acting of her own, but as skillful as her performance is, she never gets us to look at Bev with pity and terror." For IndieWire, David Ehrlich gave the film a "C−" and wrote "Hillbilly Elegy hinges on Mamaw's hope that she'll leave her family better off than she found them, and it's clear that Vance's story has fulfilled that wish almost as soon as this movie starts. But the process of watching him cut his losses and recommit to his own success is rendered in a way that it isn't just dramatically unsatisfying in the extreme, but also on the verge of sociopathic."

Peter Travers from Good Morning America thought the film was a "missed opportunity" but Close's performance was "sensational". He concluded "With greater emphasis on simplicity instead of Hollywood showboating, Hillbilly Elegy might have been more than a missed opportunity." In her positive review, Sandra Hall from The Sydney Morning Herald praised Howard's "high-end brand of commercial movie-making" and opined that he's "to be applauded just for inviting Close, with her wealth of imagination and technique, to give us everything she has." Richard Roeper from the Chicago Sun-Times gave the film a perfect 4 out of 4 star rating, praising Adams' and Close's "exceptional work", describing Adams as a "tour de force" and Close as "masterful, screen-commanding, pitch-perfect."

Accolades 
Glenn Close became the third performer in history to be nominated for an Academy Award and a Golden Raspberry Award for the same performance.

References

External links
 
 
 

2020 films
2020 drama films
American drama films
Films about dysfunctional families
Films about heroin addiction
Films about poverty in the United States
Films based on memoirs
Films directed by Ron Howard
Films produced by Brian Grazer
Films scored by Hans Zimmer
Films set in Connecticut
Films set in Ohio
Films set in Kentucky
Films shot in Atlanta
Films shot in Ohio
Imagine Entertainment films
English-language Netflix original films
Films set in 1997
Films set in 2011
Films set in the 1990s
Films set in the 2010s
2020s English-language films
2020s American films